Henry Atte Stone (fl. 1388) was an English politician.

He was a Member (MP) of the Parliament of England for Bletchingley in September 1388.

References

Year of birth missing
Year of death missing
English MPs September 1388
14th-century English politicians